The Ikarus 231 was a courier aircraft built in Yugoslavia by Ikarus Aircraft during the late 1940s.

Design and development
The Ikarus 231 was a two-seat, low-wing monoplane of cantilever construction. It was similar to the Ikarus 211 trainer but had an enclosed cabin intended for courier service. The prototype flew in 1948 and was eventually handed over to the Yugoslav Air Force, which it served until 1958. The second prototype, which also flew in 1948, served until 1952, after which it was scrapped.

Specifications

References 

Ikarus aircraft
Low-wing aircraft
Monoplanes
1940s Yugoslav military aircraft
1950s Yugoslav military aircraft
Aircraft first flown in 1948